{{DISPLAYTITLE:Chi1 Sagittarii}}

Chi1 Sagittarii (χ1 Sagittarii) is a binary star system in the zodiac constellation of Sagittarius. The pair have a combined apparent visual magnitude of +5.03, which is bright enough to be seen with the naked eye. Based upon an annual parallax shift of 12.95 mas as seen from Earth, it is located around 252 light years from the Sun. It is advancing through space in the general direction of the Earth with a radial velocity of −43.4 km/s.

This is a visual binary with an orbital period of 5.72 years, an eccentricity of 0.710, and an angular semimajor axis of 69 mas. The primary, component A, is an A-type star showing a mixed spectrum that matches a stellar classification of A3/5 IV/V. Helmut Abt classified it as an Am star with a spectral type of kA5hF0VmF0. This notation indicates it has the calcium K-lines of an A5 star, and the hydrogen and metal lines of an F0 star. It is around 393 million years old and is spinning with a projected rotational velocity of 54 km/s. The star has an estimated 1.6 times the mass of the Sun and is radiating 42.9 times the Sun's luminosity from its photosphere at an effective temperature of 7,859 K.

References

A-type main-sequence stars
Binary stars
Sagittarii, Chi01
Sagittarius (constellation)
Durchmusterung objects
Sagittarii, 47
182369
095477
7362